This is a list of airlines which have an Air Operator Certificate issued by the Civil Aviation Authority  of Austria.

Scheduled airlines

Charter airlines

See also

 List of airports in Austria
 List of defunct airlines of Austria
 List of airlines

References

Austria
Airlines
Airlines
Austria